Carlos Vanegas (born 3 November 1945) is a Nicaraguan racewalker. He competed in the men's 20 kilometres walk at the 1968 Summer Olympics.

References

1945 births
Living people
Athletes (track and field) at the 1968 Summer Olympics
Athletes (track and field) at the 1971 Pan American Games
Nicaraguan male racewalkers
Olympic athletes of Nicaragua
Place of birth missing (living people)
Central American Games silver medalists for Nicaragua
Central American Games bronze medalists for Nicaragua
Central American Games medalists in athletics
Pan American Games competitors for Nicaragua